Natalie's Backseat Traveling Web Show was a television series consisting of 3-minute shorts on Nickelodeon in the mid to late 1990s. The series was developed by Karen Fowler and Parker Reilly and directed by Mark Foster for Nickelodeon's Creative Labs. The website was written by Caitilin McAdoo and Carmen Morais, with web design and programming by Fusebox, Inc. The original scores were composed by Michael Aharon.

Its premise was centered on a preteen girl named Natalie who managed a live web diary while her family traveled across the United States while in the backseat of the family van. The character Natalie's web site, which later became Nick.com, would also contain games, photos, audio, and video clips along with written words about the character's thoughts and musings. The website and television shorts launched simultaneously in 1996, as both correlated with the other. The show was created before weblogs, audioblogs, photo blogs, and vlogs rose in popularity in the 2000s.

See also
iCarly

External links
Cybergiants See The Future--And It's Jack And Jill BusinessWeek, April 14, 1997

1990s Nickelodeon original programming